Super Touring, Class 2 or Class II was a motor racing Touring Cars category defined by the Fédération Internationale de l'Automobile (FIA) for national touring car racing in 1993. It was based on the "2 litre Touring Car Formula" created for the British Touring Car Championship (BTCC) in 1990. The FIA organised a World Cup for the category each year from 1993 to 1995, and adopted the term "Super Tourer" from 1995.

Super Touring replaced Group A as the norm in nearly every touring car championship across the world, but escalating costs, and the withdrawal of works teams caused the category to collapse in the late 1990s.  The cars looked like regular production road cars, while expensive changes had to be made to provide space for racing tyres inside the standard wheel arches.

An example for this was the German Super Tourenwagen Cup (STW) series, which ran from 1994 to 1999, filling a void left after the end of the 2.5-litre V6-powered Deutsche Tourenwagen Meisterschaft (DTM) in 1996.  In 2000, the Deutsche Tourenwagen Masters (keeping the 'DTM' acronym) resumed with 4.0-litre V8-powered cars.

Regulations

No more than 2 litres engine capacity, maximum of six cylinders were permitted, and the engine was required to be naturally aspirated. Only two wheels could be driven and steered. For homologation, initially at least 2500 units of the model used must have been produced. In 1995, in a bid to counter the increasing numbers of homologation specials this number was increased to at least 25,000 units.

There was no restriction on body size and doors until 1993, when it was changed to only allow cars with a minimum of four doors and no smaller than the Euro NCAP 'Small Family Car' class, although 'Large Family Car' tends to dominate the category. Until 1995, teams were only permitted to fit aerodynamic device that were available through dealers, but that changed when, in 1994 BTCC season, Alfa Romeo entered a 155 with Gabriele Tarquini and Giampiero Simoni as drivers. The car had a front spoiler with a bottom piece that could be unscrewed and moved forward, acting as a splitter, and a rear spoiler with a pair of extensions, giving the car more downforce. When Alfa Romeo won the first five rounds, Ford, supported by Vauxhall, made a complaint to the race stewards. TOCA soon decided the aero devices were illegal and Alfa Romeo were stripped of the points they earned at Snetterton and Silverstone (although this decision was later reversed by appeal) and in return, walked out from the Oulton Park race. After this point, Alfa were forced to run their spoilers in the retracted position (the position in which the spoilers were fitted on the road going version, the Alfa 155 Silverstone – of which only 2,500 cars were homologated to allow the use of the aerodynamic devices and higher rev limits for a 1.8-litre car – though the road car was sold with two unfitted spoiler extension brackets). In the meantime, Renault and BMW responded by introducing their own limited edition road cars (Laguna Airflow and 318is, respectively) to enable them to run with oversized aerodynamic aids; Renault would win the Oulton Park race that Alfa Romeo had walked out. Soon after that, the FIA changed the regulation in all series to increase minimum number of produced road cars for homologation to 25,000, and allowing cars to only use non-production aerodynamic devices with a restricted size. Restrictions varied depending on body type, with Volvo having to revert from the 850 Estate to their four-door saloon model the following season when they found themselves to be disadvantaged by the new rules. In the Italian Supertourismo category, teams entered extended spoilers without complaints.

Some series however, would change the rules to suit crowd demands, and competition from rival series, one example, was the Japanese Touring Car Championship (JTCC), which made increases to body width and exhaust noise while restricting front aerodynamic devices in 1997 (which allowed Toyota to use the larger Toyota Chaser); it ultimately backfired when Nissan and Honda left the series at the end of season, leaving Toyota as the only manufacturer that competed. In 1999, a new formula using spaceframe cars came to nothing, and the series was abandoned altogether, as by then Japan's big three all had works entries in the then-JGTC.

In Australia, the series began in 1993 when the Group A regulations for the Australian Touring Car Championship series was replaced by Supercars Group 3A Formula (known as V8 Supercars from 1997 onwards) and Super Touring. The advent of a new management structure and telecast arrangement for V8 Supercars put them in conflict with Bathurst 1000 organisers. Super Touring were offered the chance to compete at Bathurst after race organisers could not come to terms with V8 Supercars. Bathurst City Council and V8 Supercars came to a separate arrangement to host their own breakaway "Australian 1000 Classic" race. In 2000, in the absence of a rival, the V8 Supercars event took up the Bathurst 1000 name.

During the Super Touring's long run, the category suffered two fatal accidents. In 1995, Gregg Hansford at Phillip Island, and Kieth O'dor at Avus, were involved in fatal accidents as a result of a broken neck caused by their cars' being hit side-on. Soon after, rollcages in competition cars with built-in side impact bars, and seats with head restraints on the side would become mandatory.

One reason for Super Touring's demise was the cost of preparing a car for competition. In 1990, a Vauxhall Cavalier cost £60,000. By the later part of the 90's, a similar car with more sophisticated aerodynamics device and telemetry cost £250,000.

The later World Touring Car Championship regulations are very inspired by the old series, with production-based four-door saloons powered by 2.0-litre engines. Wider wheel arches are allowed, which makes the cars look more spectacular. Cars under S2000 regulations are cheaper than their predecessors, to which serious modifications had to be made to allow for wider tires, lower ride height and different suspension – as the width of Super 2000 cars does not need to be the same as that of the production models, development costs can be kept lower. Various national championships use similar rules.

Although it bears no resemblance to its predecessor, the "Super Touring" name was retained by the Championnat de France de Supertourisme for their 3.0-litre tube frame cars.

List of championships that used the Super Touring formula

List of Supertouring homologated cars

See also
 Group 2 (racing)
 Group A
 Class 1 Touring Cars
 Super 2000
 Diesel 2000

References

External links

SuperTouring.co.uk – history of Super Touring
SuperTouringRegister.com – archive of cars built to Super Touring regulations
SuperTouringCars.net – Super Touring homepage with cars, facts, links, news, parts, photos
Article 262 – Technical Regulations Super Touring Cars (Group ST) 
Supertcc.com – HSCC Super Touring Car Championship

Racing car classes
Touring car racing
Fédération Internationale de l'Automobile
Motorsport categories in Australia